Mortimer Crenshaw Hill (October 24, 1922 – October 6, 1977) was an American professional basketball guard who spent one season in the National Basketball League (NBL) as a member of the Syracuse Nationals during the 1946–47 season.

References

External links
Career statistics and player information from [https://www.basketball-reference.com/nbl/players/h/hillmo01n.html basketball-reference.com

1922 births
1977 deaths
American men's basketball players
Basketball players from Los Angeles
Glendale Vaqueros men's basketball players
Guards (basketball)]
Syracuse Nationals players
UC Santa Barbara Gauchos men's basketball players